Joseph Foster may refer to:
Joseph Foster (politician) (born 1959), American politician in New Hampshire
Joseph Foster (genealogist) (1844–1905), English genealogist
Joey Foster (born 1982), British racing driver
Slaughter Joe (born 1960), British musician, also known as Joe Foster
Joe B. Foster (born 1934), American businessman, oilman and philanthropist
Joseph Foster Barham I (1729–1789), English plantation owner, to 1750 known as Joseph Foster
Joseph Markell Foster (born 1984), record producer
Joseph William Foster (born 1935), co-founder of Reebok
Joseph C. Foster (1804–1877), Scottish-born American stage manager and playwright
Joseph Andoh Foster, Ghanaian politician
Joseph Foster (silversmith), American silversmith
Joe Foster (racing driver), American racing driver in 2010 Rolex Sports Car Series season
Joseph Foster, a character in Alias Nick Beal

See also